The Bohemian Shepherd (Czech: Chodský pes) is an ancient sheep herding dog and watch dog originating from the Czech Republic.  Since 2019, the Bohemian Shepherd has been provisionally recognized by the FCI and the AKC's Foundation Stock Service.

History
The Bohemian shepherd is a herding dog and guard dog, indigenous to the Chod region (around Domažlice) of southwest Bohemia. Chronicles written during the reign of Bretislav I indicate that the Chodové were known to be accompanied by an especially faithful dog. During the reign of King Premysl Ottokar II (1253-1278), the Kingdom of Bohemia recruited the Chodové from ethnic enclaves within the western Carpathian Mountain region near the borders of what is today Slovakia, Poland, and southwestern Ukraine. These communities were relocated to serve as border patrol along the borders between Bohemia and Bavaria. It is not known if it is the same dog that accompanied the Chodové during relocation or if the breed was developed soon afterwards; however period drawings indicate it was a small, long-haired shepherd dog with prick ears. The breed quickly became indispensable to the Chodové, aiding them in border patrols but also herding and tracking game.  By 1325, the King of Bohemia, John of Luxembourg, acknowledged as a condition of their relocation and border protection, the ancestral Chodové were granted significant privileges that differentiated them from other subjects, including the right to own large dogs forbidden to ordinary Bohemian peasantry.

The Bohemian shepherd would continue to be associated with the Chodové even after their agreement with the Kingdom of Bohemia was declared void in 1695.  J.A. Gabriel, writing about the Chodové in 1864, described the local people as “Psohlavci” (Czech: Dog-heads) as their pennon featured the silhouette of a Bohemian sheepdog with a longer coat at the neck. Alois Jirásek, writing in his 1884 novel “Psohlavci” concerning the Chodové revolt of 1695, used a Bohemian shepherd as a flag symbol for them. Writer Jindrich Simon bar wrote of “Chodsky dogs” from the Sumava region in 1923, describing them as "balanced and tenacious dogs used for guarding and protecting and rounding up cattle."  

Following the aftermath of World War II, the breed nearly disappeared.  A small group of enthusiasts submitted a proposal in 1948 to get the Chod dog recognized by the FCI; however there were some disagreements on a breed standard and efforts were soon put aside. 

In 1984, International FCI judge Jan Findejs and cynology expert Dr. Vilém Kurz partnered to reestablish the Bohemian Shepherd. Advertisements were placed in local Czech newspapers searching for Bohemian shepherds with a handful of owners coming forward. Dogs were assessed and compared with preserved documentation, written materials and period drawings. The main goal was to raise healthy dogs with good temperaments. In 1985, the first litter was born to this program.  In 2000, the studbook was closed to previously unregistered dogs. There are currently ~7300 registered Bohemian Shepherds.

Despite their appearances, there is no evidence to suggest they are related to German Shepherd dogs.

Introduction to North America 
The club established standards with the objective of starting breeding programs in North America dedicated to best practices for healthy and diverse full bred gene pools. In 2019 an owner from the USA traveled with a female Bohemian Shepherd to the Czech Republic to be mated. The mating was successful, and puppies were subsequently whelped in the USA. In 2022, one of the founding members of the club and owner of three Bohemian Shepherds became the first in North America to both breed and whelp Bohemian Shepherd puppies in the USA. Six males and one female were whelped in Illinois. This event placed the introduction of the breed to North America on a new level. As of 2022 it is estimated there are roughly 50 Bohemian Shepherds in North America.

Description

Appearance

The Bohemian Shepherd is medium sized, rectangular-shaped dog, standing 48–55 cm (19-22 inches) at the withers and weighing about 15–25 kg (35-55 lb). Long, thick fur and a rich undercoat allow him to survive in harsh weathers. Desired fur color is "black with tan." The body is compact and well proportioned with high set, small, pointed, erect ears, and a long, elegant neckline. A fluid, light and unhurried gait is one of the typical characteristics of this breed.

Temperament
Bohemian Shepherds are lively and quick dogs that make great all around sport dogs and family pets. Quick learning and biddable, Bohemian Shepherds relate well to children and other pets. The breed is agile and has a keen sense of smell, making them proficient search and rescue dogs or a great companion for handicapped people, and an outstanding watch dog. This breed has a stable, calm, and friendly temperament that allows it to be good with the owner, his family, and especially with children.

Health 
The Bohemian shepherd is generally considered a healthy breed with few hereditary diseases, in part due to strict guidelines established in the 1990s by the Czech breed club. The average lifespan is 12-14 years.

In Popular Culture 

 A Bohemian shepherd silhouette is used the Czech scout organization Junák’s badges.
 The largest statue of a dog is a Bohemian shepherd statue designed by Michal Olšiak near the village of Újezd ​​near Domažlice in the Plzeň Region. The statue measures almost four meters in height and eight meters in length.

See also
 Beauceron dog
 Dogs portal
 Garafian Shepherd dog
 List of dog breeds
 Old German Herding dogs

References

External links

 Bohemian Shepherd Breed Standard FCI

FCI breeds
Dog breeds originating in the Czech Republic
Herding dogs

The Bohemian Shepherd  https://english.radio.cz/czech-dog-breeds-8742713/2